Club Deportivo Getxo is a Spanish football team based in Getxo, Biscay, in the autonomous community of Basque Country. Founded in 1927 it plays in División Honor Bizkaia, holding home matches at Campo Municipal de Fadura, with a 3,500-seat capacity.

Season to season

1 season in Segunda División B
47 seasons in Tercera División

Honours
Tercera División: 1958–59

Notable players

 Tomas Agirre
 Koldo Aguirre
 Luis Echeberría
 Manuel Etura
 José María Maguregui
 José Orúe
 Carlos Ruiz
 Daniel Ruiz
 Ángel Villar

External links
Official website 
Futbolme team profile 

Association football clubs established in 1927
Football clubs in the Basque Country (autonomous community)
1927 establishments in Spain
Getxo